Thomas Goldsmith may refer to:

Thomas Goldsmith, the 1406 MP for Derby
Thomas Goldsmith (pirate) (died 1714), pirate and privateer from Dartmouth
Thomas T. Goldsmith Jr. (1910–2009), chief of research for DuMont Laboratories, co-inventor of an early arcade game and professor of physics
Tumbleweed Tommy (Thomas Goldsmith), former member of the band Riders in the Sky